The following table shows the world record progression in the Women's 3,000 metres. The first record officially recognised by the IAAF was set on 6 July 1974 by Lyudmila Bragina from the Soviet Union.

As of June 21, 2009, the IAAF has ratified nine world records in the event.

Pre-IAAF, to 1974

IAAF era, from 1974

* - indicates ratified time. Auto times for Bragina's 8:52.8 and 8:27.2 were 8:52.74 and 8:27.12 respectively.

See also 
 World record progression for the Men's 3,000 m
 Long-distance track event

References
ARRS
Statistics (Internet Archive)

Women's world athletics record progressions
World record